Alexi Áñez Pereyra (born 2 October 1990) is a Bolivian footballer who plays as a forward for the Bolivia women's national team.

Early life
Áñez hails from the Santa Cruz Department.

International career
Áñez played for Bolivia at senior level in the 2018 Copa América Femenina.

References

1990 births
Living people
Women's association football forwards
Bolivian women's footballers
People from Santa Cruz Department (Bolivia)
Bolivia women's international footballers